The 1896 West Virginia gubernatorial election took place on November 3, 1896, to elect the governor of West Virginia.

Results

References

1896
gubernatorial
West Virginia
November 1896 events